Palmetto is a city in Manatee County, Florida, United States. As of the 2020 census, the population was listed as 13,323. It is part of the North Port–Sarasota–Bradenton metropolitan statistical area.

History
A post office called Palmetto has been in operation since 1868. Samuel Sparks Lamb is considered the "Father of Palmetto," having surveyed and plotted the city at its outset and donated several plots of land. He owned a general merchandise store in town. Samuel Sparks Lamb was from Clarke County, Mississippi, and arrived in the area near the Manatee River in 1868 establishing Palmetto. The city received its name from the palmetto trees near the original town site. Palmetto was first incorporated in May 1893 as a village, with its first mayor being P.S. Harlee. Palmetto was reincorporated as a city in 1897 and in the following years grew. In 1902 with the arrival of the railroad, the center of town moved from the waterfront to the Seaboard Air Line train station, served by the Sarasota Branch from Turkey Creek near Plant City through Palmetto to "Bradentown" and Sarasota. By 1921, the Atlantic Coast Line Railroad was operating a Tampa Southern Railroad Branch from Tampa to Palmetto and "Bradentown".

Compiled during the late 1930s and first published in 1939, the Federal Writers' Project's Florida guide listed Palmetto's population as 3,043 and described it as: 

A dolomite mine existed in Palmetto on the Manatee River from the 1950s to 1974. Several failed attempts were made to redevelop the property. In 1974, the property was almost sold for residential development, but the company backed out due to the economic recession that was occurring. In 1978, a proposal was made to create a residential community on the site. The site's master plan contained a nationwide motel chain with a restaurant, high-rise apartments along the Manatee River, single-family houses, and a shopping center built around a lake created from mining activities. The former  dolomite mine site was bought by WC Riveria Partners. It was then redeveloped in 1998 as Riveria Dunes, a residential community with a marina, townhouses, and homes.

Geography
Palmetto is in central Manatee County, on the north side of the tidal Manatee River, across from the city of Bradenton, the county seat.

Demographics

As of the 2010 United States Census, there were 12,606 people, 4,891 households, and 3,192 families residing in the city. The racial makeup of the city was 72.10% White, 10.5% African American, 0.4% Native American, 0.6% Asian, 0.0% Pacific Islander, 14.2% from other races, and 2.2% from two or more races. Hispanic or Latino of any race were 28.3% of the population.

There were 4,891 total households: 3,192 (65.3%) family households and 1,699 (34.7%) non-family households.  Of the 3,192 family households 23.4% had children under the age of 18 living with them, 47.4% were married couples living together, 5.3% had a male householder with no wife present, and 12.6% had a female householder with no husband present. Within all households, 28.1% were made up of householders living alone and 14.8% had the individual living alone and was 65 years of age or older. The average household size was 2.53 and the average family size was 3.07.

In Palmetto, the age distribution among the population includes 24.8% being 19 years old and under, 5.6% from 20 to 24, 21.6% from 25 to 44, 26.0% from 45 to 64, and 22.0% who were 65 years of age or older. The median age was 43.1 years. For every 100 females, there were 100.012 males. For every 100 males age 18 and over, there were 98.86 females.

Government 
The mayor of Palmetto is the city's head executive and is elected every four years. The city commission serves as the city's legislative body and has five members. Three of the commissioners are elected from their respective wards while the other two are elected at-large citywide. The city commission has the power to elect a vice-mayor who serves for a one year term.

Education 
Palmetto is home to Blackburn, Palmetto, James Tillman, Virgil Mills and Palmview Elementary Schools, Lincoln and Buffalo Creek Middle Schools and Palmetto High School. Charter schools include Manatee School for the Arts (grades 6–12), Imagine School of North Manatee (grades K–8), and Palmetto Charter School (grades K–8).

Media
The metro area has TV broadcasting stations that serve the Tampa-Saint Petersburg-Sarasota (DMA) as defined by Nielsen Media Research.

Transportation
US Route 41 and US Route 301 converge in Palmetto.

The Atlantic Coast Line's West Coast Champion passenger train into Palmetto, from New York bound for Sarasota, ceased making stops in Palmetto after the Atlantic Coast Line and Seaboard Coast Line merged in 1967 into the Seaboard Coast Line and Palmetto was dropped as a stop.

Notable people
 George Dickie, philosopher
 Eric Engberg, former CBS News correspondent
 Winfield R. Gaylord, Wisconsin state senator, socialist politician, minister
 Ralph Haben, former Speaker of the Florida House of Representatives
 Tom Hume, former pitcher and coach for Cincinnati Reds
 Curtis Johnson, sprinter in the 2000 Summer Olympics
 Nick Neri, race car driver
 Mistral Raymond, former NFL defensive back for the Minnesota Vikings and former captain at the University of South Florida
 Willie Taggart, head coach for Florida Atlantic Owls football, former head coach of Florida State Seminoles football, Oregon Ducks football and South Florida Bulls football

Points of interest
 Palmetto Estuary Preserve
 Palmetto Historic District
 Palmetto Historical Park

References

External links
 

Cities in Manatee County, Florida
Sarasota metropolitan area
Cities in Florida
Populated places on Tampa Bay
1897 establishments in Florida
Populated places established in 1897